Cliniodes nacrealis is a moth in the family Crambidae. It was described by Eugene G. Munroe in 1964. It is found in Cuba, on Hispaniola and in Puerto Rico.

References

Moths described in 1964
Eurrhypini